Robert Powell Smith (March 5, 1929January 20, 2012) was an American diplomat.

Early life
Smith was born on March 5, 1929, to parents Powell Augusta and Estella M. Smith.

Military career
Smith served in the United States Marine Corps.

Diplomatic career
Smith was appointed by President Richard Nixon on July 23, 1974, to the position of United States Ambassador to Malta. The presentation of his credentials for this position occurred on September 24, 1974. The termination of this mission occurred on October 29, 1976. Smith was then appointed by President Gerald Ford on October 4, 1976, to the position of United States Ambassador to Ghana. The presentation of his credentials for this position occurred on December 17, 1976. The termination of this mission occurred on May 7, 1979. Smith's final diplomatic appointment was made by President Jimmy Carter on July 2, 1979, for the position of United States Ambassador to Liberia. The presentation of his credentials for this position occurred on August 6, 1979. The termination of this final mission occurred on January 15, 1981.

Personal life
Smith resided in both Texas and Virginia.

Death
Smith died on January 20, 2012. He was interred in the Arlington National Cemetery.

References

1929 births
2012 deaths
Ambassadors of the United States to Malta
Ambassadors of the United States to Ghana
Ambassadors of the United States to Liberia
Burials at Arlington National Cemetery
20th-century American diplomats